This is a list of series released by or aired on TVB Jade Channel in 1989.

First line-up
These dramas air in Hong Kong from 7:35pm to 8:35 pm, Monday to Friday on Jade.

Second line-up
These dramas air in Hong Kong from 8:35 pm to 9:05 pm, Monday to Friday on Jade.

Third line-up
These dramas air in Hong Kong from 9:25pm to 10:25pm, Monday to Friday on Jade.

Other series

Warehoused series
These dramas were released overseas and have not broadcast on TVB Jade Channel.

External links
  TVB.com

TVB dramas